The 2018 Netball Quad Series was the fifth Netball Quad Series of test matches, contested by four of the five highest ranked nations in netball. Australia won the series, winning all three of their matches to claim their fourth Quad Series title.

The series took place in the month of September 2018.

Teams

Matches

Round 1

Round 2

Round 3

Standings
<noinclude>

See also

 Netball Quad Series

References

External links
  Fixtures for the series – Netball Australia website
 

2018
2018 in netball
2018 in Australian netball
2018 in New Zealand netball
2018 in English netball
2018 in South African women's sport
International netball competitions hosted by Australia
International netball competitions hosted by New Zealand
Netball Quad Series
Netball Quad Series